Hurm may refer to:

People
 Gerd Hurm (born 1958), German professor of American studies
 Karl Hurm (1930–2019), German painter

Places
 Hürm, Austria